KEMA Toren is a  broadcasting tower built of reinforced concrete at Arnhem, Netherlands. It was built in 1969 by KEMA for communicating between high voltage substations throughout the Netherlands. It is now used for public radio and TV broadcasting. It is also known as TenneT Toren, after TenneT, the present owner of the tower.

See also
 List of towers

External links
 
 Page at emporis.com
 Page at SkyscraperCity
 Photo at nederlandonline

Communication towers in the Netherlands
Towers in Gelderland
Buildings and structures in Arnhem
Towers completed in 1969
1969 establishments in the Netherlands
20th-century architecture in the Netherlands